Bayrampaşa SK is a Turkish professional football club located in the Bayrampaşa district of Istanbul. They currently play in the TFF Third League, the fourth tier of Turkish football.

History 
In 1942 the club was founded as Sağmalcılar Youth Sports Club, in 1959 the name was changed to Bayrampaşa Youth Sports Club. The club has spent the majority of its history in the third division, between 1984 and 1994, before being relegated to the amateur divisions. In 2009, after 16 years, they returned to the fourth tier of Turkish football. Soon after, in May 2012 they beat Hacettepe S.K. by a score of 2–1, thereby being promoted back into the TFF Second League (after being out for 53 years). In the 2012–2013 season, right after promotion, they reached the play-offs, but were eventually knocked out.

Supporters 
The fans are referred to as the "Bayrampaşalılar". The fan movement has started in the late 1980s, and has been present ever since. As of 2014, the Association of Bayrampaşa Fans takes part in helping charitable organizations, visiting schools, and other charitable activities.
The fans share a rivalry with Gaziosmanpaşaspor and Eyüpspor.

Squad

See also 
 Turkish football league system, overview of football in Turkey
 TFF Second League#Red Group, 2012–2014+
 TFF Third League, 1984–1994 and also 2009–2012
 Amatör Futbol Ligleri, 1994–2009

References 
 http://www.turus.net/sport/fussball/7621-bayrampasaspor-istanbul-vs-ankaraguecue-tuerkischer-drittligafussball-bei-ansprechender-kulisse.html, German magazine
 
 
  Same source has half-a-dozen other pieces online.

External links 
Official website
Bayrampaşa on TFF.org

Sport in Istanbul
Football clubs in Istanbul
Association football clubs established in 1959
1959 establishments in Turkey
Bayrampaşa